Lo-V or variant may refer to:
 low voltage
 Standard Lo-V (New York City Subway car)
 Flivver Lo-V (New York City Subway car)
 Steinway Lo-V (New York City Subway car)
 World's Fair Lo-V (New York City Subway car)
 low velocity